Eric Randall Nance (January 9, 1960 – November 28, 2005) was an American man who was convicted of murder in the state of Arkansas. Nance was executed in 2005.

Murder 
On October 11, 1993, 18-year-old Julie Heath (June11, 1975–October11, 1993) was driving on U.S. Highway 270 between Malvern and Hot Springs, Arkansas, to visit her boyfriend in Hot Springs. Nance stated that he stopped to help Heath after her car broke down and offered her a ride to Malvern. The prosecution said that Nance then raped and murdered her. He was later seen in a convenience store wearing no shoes, socks, or shirt. According to the clerk, there appeared to be fresh dark, damp stains on his overalls.

Heath's body was found on October 18, 1993, by a hunter. Her throat had been cut. Photographs of the scene show that she was fully clothed, but her belt buckle was partially undone, her pants zipper was not fully up, and the left shoulder of her shirt was torn. The shirt was also on inside out. The medical examiner also reported that her socks and panties were on inside out and her bra was pulled up around the neck and shoulder area. A pubic hair located in Nance's pickup was said by an expert to be microscopically identical to that of Heath.

Nance said he accidentally killed Heath. According to defense testimony, she had become hysterical after seeing a utility knife and began to kick at him. Putting up his hand to stop her, he accidentally lodged the knife in her throat. This version of events was told at the trial by his brother and sister, to whom Nance had told his version of events.

The TV show "Murder Comes to Town" on the Investigation Discovery channel presented this murder mystery in Season 5 Episode 7 "Something's Not Right". Later, his sister Belinda, told his story on the "Evil Lives Here" episode "They Say I Killed My Brother."

Trial and appeals 
Nance was found guilty of capital felony murder, with attempted rape as the underlying felony. During the sentencing phase of the trial, it was revealed that five months before the murder, Nance had been released from a twenty-year sentence for beating two Oklahoma girls in 1982. The jury found that there were no mitigating circumstances in the case, and recommended that the judge sentence Nance to death, which he did on March 31, 1994.

His lawyers argued that it would be unconstitutional (Atkins v. Virginia) to execute Nance, as he was mentally retarded. A psychologist said that Nance had an IQ below 70, whereas a psychiatrist testified that he found Nance to have an IQ of 105. The defense also argued that DNA tests could show that the pubic hair did not come from Heath.

On November 17, 2005, the Arkansas Parole Board recommended, with a vote of 6–1, that Governor Mike Huckabee deny clemency for Nance. The dissenting vote was from one member who wanted to stay the execution to give more time to determine if Nance was intellectually disabled.

The execution was briefly stayed on November 17 by United States federal judge James Moody of the Eastern District of Arkansas. The stay was vacated by the 8th Circuit Court of Appeals on November 19.

Execution 
Originally the execution was scheduled for 8 p.m. on November 28. There was a temporary stay order by Justice Clarence Thomas to give him more time to review the case. Thomas was the justice responsible for handling emergency cases from Arkansas. The stay was vacated shortly afterwards and all appeals denied.

Nance asked for a final meal of two bacon cheeseburgers, french fries, two pints of chocolate chip cookie dough ice cream, and two Coca-Colas. He made no last statement. Given a lethal injection, he was pronounced dead at 9:24 p.m. CST. It was the first execution by the state of Arkansas since Charles Laverne Singleton on January 6, 2004.

Witnesses described the execution as surreal. Although Nance offered no last words, his spiritual advisor yelled, "May God have mercy on our souls!", which startled some witnesses.

Writings and song 
In 1995, Nance began a decade-long correspondence with James Nelson, an Irish tenor who is critical of the death penalty. Through their friendship, Nelson realized "that Eric's only means of escape from [his] hell's purgatory was through his letters, his memories and his dreams." With fellow Celtic Tenors Niall Morris and Matthew Gilsenan, Nelson set a poem of Nance's to music and entitled it, "Eric's Song". After Nance's execution, the Celtic Tenors released the song on their album, Remember Me.

See also 
 Capital punishment in Arkansas
 Capital punishment in the United States
 List of people executed in Arkansas
 List of people executed in the United States in 2005

References

External links 
 Eric Randall Nance. The Clark County Prosecuting Attorney. Retrieved on 2007-11-10.
 Do Not Execute Eric Randall Nance!. NCADP – The National Coalition to Abolish the Death Penalty. Retrieved on 2007-11-10.
 Nance v. Norris. United States Court of Appeals for the Eighth Circuit (2005-11-22). Retrieved on 2007-11-10.
 

1960 births
2005 deaths
1993 murders in the United States
20th-century American criminals
21st-century executions by Arkansas
21st-century executions of American people
American male criminals
American people executed for murder
American rapists
Crime in Arkansas
Criminals from Arkansas
Male murderers
People executed by Arkansas by lethal injection
People convicted of murder by Arkansas